Franco Testa (born 7 February 1938) is a retired Italian cyclist. He won a gold medal in the team pursuit at the 1960 Summer Olympics and a silver medal at the 1964 Summer Olympics. In 1964 he also won a team silver medal at the world championships. In 1965–67 he rode as professional, but with little success.

References

1938 births
Living people
Cyclists at the 1960 Summer Olympics
Cyclists at the 1964 Summer Olympics
Olympic cyclists of Italy
Olympic gold medalists for Italy
Olympic silver medalists for Italy
Italian male cyclists
Olympic medalists in cycling
Cyclists from the Province of Padua
Medalists at the 1960 Summer Olympics
Medalists at the 1964 Summer Olympics
Mediterranean Games silver medalists for Italy
Competitors at the 1959 Mediterranean Games
Italian track cyclists
Mediterranean Games medalists in cycling